On 7 August 2013, two men on motorcycles threw acid on two 18-year-old British volunteer teachers, Katie Gee and Kirstie Trup, near Stone Town, Zanzibar, Tanzania.

Background
Katie Gee and Kirstie Trup are from Hampstead, London. They were volunteering at a local school in Zanzibar.

Prior incidents
In November 2012, Sheik Fadhil Soraga was the victim of an acid attack.

In February, a Roman Catholic priest was shot to death and a church was burned down. In the past, another priest was shot and wounded and other churches were also burned.

According to a close friend of the two, a Muslim woman struck Ms. Trup in the face for singing in public during Ramadan.

Acid attack
The two were nearing the end of their one-month volunteer teaching when the attack happened. The attack happened at 7:15 pm on 7 August 2013. The two women were walking on the street on their way to dinner when their attackers approached and threw sulphuric acid on them.

Both women suffered burns to their face, hands, and chest. One woman suffered lesser injuries because she was walking on the side of the curb away from the attackers, so was doused with less liquid.

Aftermath
After being treated at a local hospital, the two returned to London to be treated by specialists. Gee lost an ear and faces further multiple operations, but has expressed determination to overcome the attack and a desire for justice.

Five men were questioned by the police as of August 9, 2013. As of August 13, 2013, no arrests have been made for committing the acid attack and the motive for the attack is unknown.

Police have arrested Sheikh Issa Ponda Issa after he ran from the police. He was wanted for a possible connection to the acid attack. Mr Ponda had previously been convicted of inciting religious hatred.
A reward of 10 million Tanzanian shillings has been offered for information leading to the capture of the attackers.

References

2013 crimes in Tanzania
August 2013 crimes in Africa
History of Zanzibar
Violence in Tanzania
Acid attack victims